Water Efficiency Labelling and Standard (WELS) is a labeling scheme initiated by the Australian Government to help Australian households conserve water and money. On 1 July 2006, it became mandatory across Australia to carry a (WELS) Water Rating label when selling showers, washing machines, dishwashers, toilet equipment, urinal equipment and tap equipment intended for use over kitchen sinks, bathroom basins, laundry tubs or ablution troughs.

See also
Energy rating label
Water efficiency

References

External links
 Water Rating scheme

2006 introductions
Ecolabelling
Water conservation
Water supply and sanitation in Australia